Ronald Edgar Burge (born 3 October 1932) is a former Professor of Physics at King's College London, where he was Wheatstone Professor of Physics from 1989 to 2000.

Early life
He attended Canton High School, a boys' grammar school, in Cardiff and King's College London (BSc, Physics; PhD).

Career
He joined King's College London in 1954 at the age of 21. His work looked at the structure of fibrous proteins. He was Head of the Department of Physics at King's College London from October 1984 to 1992.

Personal life
He married in 1953 and they have two sons.

References

1932 births
Alumni of King's College London
Academics of King's College London
Fellows of King's College London
Fellows of the Institute of Physics
Scientists from Cardiff
Welsh physicists
Living people
20th-century British physicists
20th-century Welsh scientists